Alexandre "Alex" Bioussa (17 March 1901 – 14 September 1966) was a French rugby union player who competed in the 1924 Summer Olympics. He was born and died in Toulouse. In 1924 he won the silver medal as member of the French team.

References

External links
dataOlympics profile

1901 births
1966 deaths
French rugby union players
Olympic rugby union players of France
Rugby union players at the 1924 Summer Olympics
Olympic silver medalists for France
Rugby union players from Toulouse
Medalists at the 1924 Summer Olympics
France international rugby union players